This was the first edition of the event.

Diego Sebastián Schwartzman and Horacio Zeballos won the title, defeating Andreas Beck and Martin Fischer in the final, 6–4, 3–6, [10–5].

Seeds

  Nicholas Monroe /  Simon Stadler (semifinals)
  Dominik Meffert /  Philipp Oswald (semifinals)
  Philipp Marx /  Alexander Satschko (quarterfinals)
  Christopher Kas /  Frank Moser (withdrew)

Draw

Draw

References
 Main Draw

Open du Pays d'Aix - Doubles
2014 Doubles